Mount Vernon Harcourt, also unofficially known as Mount Harcourt, is a conical stratovolcano, that rises over 1,535 meters, making up part of the Hallett Peninsula extending into the Ross Sea about  south of Mount Erebus, along with three overlapping shield volcanoes. The mountain was discovered in January 1841 by Sir James Clark Ross and named by him for the Reverend William Vernon Harcourt, one of the founders of the British Association.

Mount Vernon Harcourt is part of the Hallett Volcanic Province of the McMurdo Volcanic Group. Two dates have been obtained from the volcano's rock, roughly 5.5 and 6.6 million years in age. These samples are alkalic in composition.

See also 
List of volcanoes in Antarctica

References 

Stratovolcanoes of New Zealand
Volcanoes of Victoria Land
Miocene stratovolcanoes
Borchgrevink Coast